Panka is a genus of cicadas in the family Cicadidae. About nine described species are in Panka.

Species
These nine species belong to the genus Panka:
 Panka africana Distant, 1905 c g
 Panka duartei Boulard, 1975 c g
 Panka lunguncus Boulard, 1970 c g
 Panka minimuncus Boulard, 1970 c g
 Panka parvula Boulard, 1973 c g
 Panka parvulina Boulard, 1995 c g
 Panka silvestris Jacobi, 1912 c g
 Panka simulata Distant, 1905 c g
 Panka umbrosa Distant, 1920 c g
Data sources: i = ITIS, c = Catalogue of Life, g = GBIF, b = Bugguide.net

References

Further reading

 
 
 
 

Lamotialnini
Cicadidae genera